The 6th Dragoons or 6th Dragoon Regiment may refer to:
6th (Inniskilling) Dragoons, a British regiment active 1689-1922
6th Dragoon Regiment (France), a French regiment

See also 
6th Dragoon Guards
6th Regiment (disambiguation)